The plunket shark or Plunket's shark (Scymnodon plunketi) is a sleeper shark of the family Somniosidae, found around south eastern Australia, and New Zealand, at depths of between 220 and 1,550 m over continental shelves.  It reaches a length of 130 cm.

References

 

Scymnodon
Fish described in 1910